Rivercrest School District, formerly Southern Mississippi County School District, is a public school district based in Rivercrest High School in unincorporated Mississippi County, Arkansas, United States, with a Wilson postal address. The school district provides early childhood, elementary and secondary education for more than 1,300 prekindergarten through grade 12 students and employs more than 220 staff (including faculty) at its two facilities.  The district encompasses  of land in Mississippi County.

It serves the municipalities of Wilson, Bassett, Birdsong, Dyess, Joiner, Keiser, Luxora, Marie, and Victoria. It also includes a portion of Osceola and a small portion of Etowah. Additionally several unincorporated areas are on the map: Driver, and Frenchmans Bayou.

Rivercrest School District and its schools are accredited by the Arkansas Department of Education (ADE).

History 
It was formed in 1968 by the merger of the Dyess, Keiser, Shawnee, and Wilson school districts.

On July 1, 1986, the Luxora School District consolidated into the Southern Mississippi County School District.

Schools 
 Rivercrest High School —serving more than 540 students in grades 7 through 12.
 Rivercrest Elementary School  -serving more than 700 Pre-Kindergarten through grade 6.

Demographics
As of 2011, 64% of the students were white.

References

External links 
 
 

School districts in Arkansas
Education in Mississippi County, Arkansas
1968 establishments in Arkansas
School districts established in 1968